The 1994–95 Club León season is the 55th season in the football club's history and the 5th consecutive season in the top flight of Mexican football.

Summary
In summertime President Zermeño appointed Roberto Saporiti as new manager of the club. Saporiti arrived from Necaxa (1991-94) being credited of building the core of upcoming back-to-back Champions with transfers in such as Alex Aguinaga, Alberto Garcia Aspe, Ignacio Ambriz and Ivo Basay. The squad was reinforced with several players: midfielder Marcelo Balboa on loaned from Major League Soccer which inaugural season was delayed until 1996,   Forward Gerardo Reinoso from Correcaminos UAT and 30-yr-old Gustavo Dezotti arriving from  US Cremonese. Club legend Milton Queiroz "Tita" left the club transferred out to Puebla FC.

However, Saporiti was sacked on round 12 after a humiliating defeat 2-5 at home against Atlético Morelia, being replaced as head coach by Jose Guadalupe Diaz for the rest of the season. The squad improved its performance delivering a decent second half of the league season aimed with goals scored by "ageing" Gustavo Dezotti who became crutial to compete for the last Playoff spot although, finally, the club was eliminated by just two points not classifying for post season for the second consecutive year.

Squad

Transfers

Winter

Competitions

La Liga

League table

Group 1

General table

Results by round

Matches

References

External links

1994–95 Mexican Primera División season
1994–95 in Mexican football